Mirza Shah Mahmud (born c. 1446) was briefly a Timurid ruler of Herat. He was the son of Abul-Qasim Babur Mirza, who was a great-grandson of Timur. Shah Mahmud succeeded his father upon his death in 1457 at the age of eleven. Only a few weeks later, his cousin Ibrahim Mirza, a son of Ala al-Dawla Mirza, expelled him from Herat. Shah Mahmud failed to distinguish himself in the following years, and died sometime in the 1460s.

Timurid monarchs
Timurid dynasty
People from Herat
1440s births
1460s deaths